The Vintage Bradbury (1965) was the first "best of" collection of the stories of Ray Bradbury, as selected by the author. It was published by Vintage Books, a paperback division of Random House.

Contents
 "The Watchful Poker Chip of H. Matisse"
 "The Veldt"
 "Hail and Farewell"
 "A Medicine for Melancholy"
 "The Fruit at the Bottom of the Bowl"
 "Ylla"
 "The Little Mice"
 "The Small Assassin"
 "The Anthem Sprinters"
 "And the Rock Cried Out"
 "Invisible Boy"
 "Night Meeting"
 "The Fox and the Forest"
 "Skeleton"
 Selections from Dandelion Wine
 "Illumination"
 "Dandelion Wine"
 "Statues"
 "Green Wine for Dreaming"
 "Kaleidoscope"
 "Sun and Shadow"
 "The Illustrated Man"
 "The Fog Horn"
 "The Dwarf"
 "Fever Dream"
 "The Wonderful Ice Cream Suit"
 "There Will Come Soft Rains"

References

External links
 
 

1965 short story collections
Short story collections by Ray Bradbury